Kaleo Okalani Kanahele Maclay (born June 11, 1996) is an American Paralympic volleyballist.

Early life
Kanahele was born in Oklahoma City, Oklahoma with clubbed left foot. When she turned 9 months old her surgeon performed tenotomy, but it didn't yield anything positive. Since that time her leg was shorter than the other with a small calf muscle that is not very flexible. She started playing basketball at the age of 7 and a year later started softball. In softball, she granted first baseman position for Oklahoma Reign. By age 9 she started playing volleyball and at age 10 played it for Oklahoma Peak Performance. Due to her, the team took 42nd place in the USA Volleyball Girls’ Junior National championships. In 2009, the same team took 18th place. In her spare time Kanahele likes to listen to Kings of Leon music group.

Career
She started competing in sitting volleyball, a sport in the Paralympic Games, in 2010 where she won a gold medal for her participation at Parapan American Championship which was held in Colorado and a silver one for a WOVD Championship. In 2011 and 2012 respectively she won three gold medals at ECVD Continental Cup, Parapan American Zonal Championship, and Volleyball Masters. She also got 2nd silver medal for her participation at 2012 Paralympic Games, her first Paralympic Games, in London.

In June 2014 she competed at the World Championships in Elblag, Poland at which she and Nicky Nieves each scored 7 points in a match against China. The Team USA scored 23-25, 25-22, 19-25, 25-21, 17-15 as overall victory.

She was part of the USA team which won the gold at 2015 Parapan American Games in Toronto, Canada.

References

External links
 
 
 

1996 births
Paralympic volleyball players of the United States
Paralympic silver medalists for the United States
Sportspeople from Oklahoma City
Living people
Medalists at the 2012 Summer Paralympics
Volleyball players at the 2012 Summer Paralympics
American sitting volleyball players
Women's sitting volleyball players
Paralympic medalists in volleyball